Solidità della nebbia (Solidity of mist) is a piece of electronic music, composed by Juan Maria Solare, for bassett horn and electronic sounds. It was made at the Studio of the Musikhochschule in Cologne with the support of Marcel Schmidt and the guidance of Hans Ulrich Humpert. Based on samples of basset horn, performed by Michele Marelli, and of his voice. The first performance was by Michele Marelli (corno di bassetto) on 12 October 2000 in the Aula Magna of the Hochschule für Musik at Cologne, opening the festival for the 35th anniversary of the School's Studio for Electronic Music. It was repeated by Michele Marelli on 25 January 2002 in Alessandria (Italy) for the Jazz Association "L' AX". In May 2002 the piece won an award at the Tribuna Argentina de Música Electroacústica (TRIME), organized by the Foundation Encuentros Internacionales de Música Contemporánea (EIMC-SIMC), with the support of the Consejo Argentino de la Música (CAMU-CIM-Unesco).

Compositions by Juan María Solare